Nicola and Teena Collins (identical twins, born c.1974) are English-born filmmakers currently living in Los Angeles. Formerly models then actresses, they are perhaps most well known for their portrayals of Alex and Susi, the twin daughters of Doug "The Head" Denovitz in the film Snatch.

In 2009 they made their filmmaking debut with The End, a documentary featuring interviews with former East End gangsters, one of which is the twins' father Les Falco. The film was directed by Nicola, who also conducted the interviews. Teena was the film's producer.

The twins' next film venture is Do As You Likey, a documentary about British gypsy culture.

Acting filmography

References

External links
 
 

1970s births
Living people
British identical twins
English documentary filmmakers
English film actresses
Identical twin actresses
Sibling filmmakers
Sibling duos
English twins
British emigrants to the United States
Women documentary filmmakers